The Ministry of Indigenous Medicine is the Sri Lankan government ministry responsible for “Offering a high living condition by contributing to the economic, social, physical, mental and spiritual well-being of the Sri Lankan people by utilizing the professional excellence of the indigenous medical systems.”

List of ministers 

The Minister of Indigenous Medicine is an appointment in the Cabinet of Sri Lanka.

Parties

See also 
 List of ministries of Sri Lanka

References

External links 
 Ministry of Indigenous Medicine
 Government of Sri Lanka

Indigenous Medicine
Indigenous Medicine
1980 establishments in Sri Lanka